The Global Militarization Index (GMI) is an annual report produced by the Bonn International Centre for Conflict Studies (BICC) which measures the relative position of nations' and regions' peacefulness. It is financially supported by German Federal Ministry for Economic Cooperation and Development.

The first GMI was published in 2006. GMI covers 154 states and is widely used to study military economies of different countries and compare them. It focuses on three major indicators: personnel, expenditures, and weapons.

Measurement 
The index uses a number of indicators.
 People Index Score: contrast between the number of military and paramilitary forces with the overall population and the number of physicians
 Military Expenditure Index Score: comparison of military expenditures with GDP and health care exprenditures
 Heavy Weapons Index Score: number of heavy weapons available per capita.

Countries 

In 2022, the top of the index looks as follows:

See also 
Global Peace Index
Global Terrorism Index
Democracy Index
World Happiness Report
Corruption Perceptions Index
Human Development Index

References 

Peace and conflict studies
International rankings
Military comparisons lists of countries